INS Kochi (D64) is the second ship of the  stealth guided-missile destroyers built under the code name Project 15A for the Indian Navy. She was constructed by Mazagon Dock Limited (MDL) in Mumbai. After undergoing extensive sea trials, she was commissioned to Indian Navy service on 30 September 2015.

Construction
The keel of Kochi was laid on 25 October 2005. In keeping with the tradition of the Navy, the warship was launched by Madhulika Verma, wife of Chief of Naval Staff, Admiral Nirmal Kumar Verma, at 11.20 a.m. 18 September 2009 from the Mazagon Dock in Mumbai. For the first time, Mazagon Docks used a "pontoon assisted" launching method in collaboration with the Russian firm Baltiysky Zavod. Under this method, pontoons are welded to the hull, which give buoyancy and helps overcome tidal constraints. Mazagon plans to use this method for all future ship launches, as the process makes it possible to launch ships with much higher weight.

Weapon trials 

On 1 November 2015, the Navy successfully test-fired the BrahMos supersonic cruise missile from Kochi. The missile hit its target, a decommissioned ship called INS Alleppey, with almost pinpoint accuracy during this first-ever vertical launch from the 7,500-tonne Kochi.

On 16 May and 29 November 2017, the Navy successfully test fired the Barak 8 missiles from Kochi.

Cooperative Engagement Capability through Joint Taskforce Coordination (JTC) mode
On 15 May 2019, INS Chennai along with INS Kochi participated in the maiden cooperative engagement firing through the employment of the full Joint Taskforce Coordination (JTC) mode which implements the MRSAM / Barak 8 ‘Cooperative Engagement’ operating mode.

Design

At the time of its commissioning, INS Kochi was the largest India-made warship. The warship is designed by the Navy's in-house organisation, Directorate of Naval Design. The ship has built with advanced stealth features which have been achieved through shaping of hull and use of radar-transparent deck fittings. A bow mounted sonar dome, the second of its kind in an indigenous naval platform, has been introduced to enhance sonar acoustic performance. The ship has a complement of about 40 officers and 350 sailors.

Naval exercises 

INS Kochi participated in the 'Zayed Talwar 2021' bilateral exercise with the United Arab Emirates Navy's Baynunah-class guided missile corvette UAES Al-Dhafra on 7 August 2021, off the coast of Abu Dhabi. The ships undertook tactical manoeuvres, Over the Horizon Targeting, Search and Rescue and Electronic Warfare exercises, with extensive use of helicopters. Less than a week later, Kochi arrived at Al Jubail for the Indian Navy's maiden naval exercise with the Royal Saudi Navy, 'Al-Mohed Al-Hindi'. The drill was meant for deeper understanding of each other’s operational practices.

See also
  - Sister ship and first of the class.
  - Sister ship and third of the class.

References

External links 
 Kolkata class Kolkata class destroyer @ Bharat-Rakshak.com
 Type 15A Kolkatta Class destroyer @ Indian-Military.org

Kolkata-class destroyers
Destroyers of the Indian Navy
2009 ships
Ships built in India